The Big Score is a 2016 Italian comedy film written, directed and starred by Carlo Verdone.

It was released on 28 January 2016.

Plot
Arturo Merlin, an ex-carabiniere turned a private investigator, is reduced to take jobs like finding cats and dogs, and is hired by Yuri Pelagatti, a stage actor, to investigate his wife.

Cast
Carlo Verdone as Arturo Merlino
Antonio Albanese as Yuri Pelagatti
Anna Kasyan as Lena
Clotilde Sabatino as Carla
Francesca Fiume as Giorgia
Massimo Popolizio as Conversani
Virginia Da Brescia as aunt Elide
Mino Caprio as Father Domenico
Eugenio Krauss as the Police Inspector
Simona Caparrini as the stage actress

References

External links

2016 films
2010s Italian-language films
Films directed by Carlo Verdone
Films set in Rome
Films shot in Rome
2016 comedy films
Italian comedy films
Universal Pictures films
2010s Italian films